Heikki Savolainen (9 April 1922 in Pori – 22 January 1975) was a Finnish stage and screen actor renowned for the part of Urho Hietanen in Edvin Laine's 1955 The Unknown Soldier (The Unknown Soldier). He also played several comedic roles in 50's Finnish movies, as well as performing in several radio plays.

Selected filmography
 The Unknown Soldier (1955)
 The Harvest Month (1956)
 Tweet, Tweet (1956)
 Little Presents (1961)

External links

1922 births
1975 deaths
People from Pori
Finnish male stage actors
Finnish male radio actors
Finnish male film actors
20th-century Finnish male actors